This is a list of the moths of family Lasiocampidae that are found in Canada. It also acts as an index to the species articles and forms part of the full List of moths of Canada.

Following the species name, there is an abbreviation that indicates the Canadian provinces or territories in which the species can be found.

Western Canada
BC = British Columbia
AB = Alberta
SK = Saskatchewan
MB = Manitoba
YT = Yukon
NT = Northwest Territories
NU = Nunavut

Eastern Canada
ON = Ontario
QC = Quebec
NB = New Brunswick
NS = Nova Scotia
PE = Prince Edward Island
NF = Newfoundland
LB = Labrador

Subfamily Lasiocampinae
Heteropacha rileyana Harvey, 1874 -ON
Phyllodesma americana (Harris, 1841) -NS, PE, NB, QC, ON, MB, SK, AB, BC, YT
Malacosoma americana (Fabricius, 1793) -NS, PE, NB, QC, ON, MB, SK, AB
Malacosoma californica (Packard, 1864) -QC, ON, MB, SK, AB, BC, NT
Malacosoma disstria Hübner, 1820 -NS, PE, NB, QC, ON, MB, SK, AB, BC

Subfamily Macromphaliinae
Tolype dayi Blackmore, 1921 -BC
Tolype laricis (Fitch, 1856) -NS, PE, NB, QC, ON, MB, SK, AB, BC
Tolype notialis Franclemont, 1973 -ON
Tolype velleda (Stoll, 1791) -NS, NB, QC, ON

External links
Moths of Canada at the Canadian Biodiversity Information Facility

Canada